Borbo havei is a butterfly in the family Hesperiidae. It is found on Madagascar. The habitat consists of transformed forest margins, grassland and anthropogenic environments.

References

Butterflies described in 1833
Hesperiinae